Virginia College was a private for-profit college located primarily in the southeastern United States. It offered classes, certificates, diplomas, and degrees related to specific professions such as health sciences, information technology, business, office management, and criminal justice. It also offered online degree programs.

After Virginia College failed to be accredited by the Accrediting Council for Continuing Education and Training, and an appeal being rejected, approximately one-third of its campuses were expected to close by 2020, the company announced in September 2018. However, by early December of 2018 all of its campuses were closing, the company "citing financial challenges and accreditation issues as the reasons".

History
The original Virginia College campus was founded in 1983 in Roanoke, Virginia. In 1989, it was acquired by Education Futures, Inc.  In February 1992, it opened its first branch campus in the Birmingham, Alabama suburb of Homewood. Another branch campus was opened in April 1993 in Huntsville, Alabama.

Ownership
The company that owns and operates the schools, Education Corporation of America, was a privately held corporation headquartered in Birmingham, Alabama.  ECA also owned Virginia College Online, which offered distance education academic programs via the Internet; Golf Academy of America; Culinard, the Culinary Institute of Virginia College, offering degrees in the culinary arts; and Ecotech Institute, offering degrees in fields of renewable energy, sustainable design, and energy efficiency.

Locations 

Brick and mortar campus locations:
Augusta, Georgia
Birmingham, Alabama
Bossier City, Louisiana
Charleston, South Carolina
Florence, South Carolina
Greenville, South Carolina
Jacksonville, Florida
Knoxville, Tennessee
Lubbock, Texas
Richmond, Virginia
Savannah, Georgia
Greensboro, North Carolina

Campuses scheduled to close by 2020
Austin, Texas
Baton Rouge, Louisiana
Biloxi, Mississippi
Jackson, Mississippi
Chattanooga, Tennessee
Columbia, South Carolina
Spartanburg, South Carolina
Columbus, Georgia
Macon, Georgia
Fort Pierce, Florida
Pensacola, Florida
Tulsa, Oklahoma
Montgomery, Alabama
Huntsville, Alabama
Mobile, Alabama
Phoenix, Arizona

Curriculum
Virginia College offered courses in health care, cosmetology, criminal justice, paralegal, and network engineering (Network engineering courses are not ABET-accredited), as well as several trades (professional training) programs such as truck driving.  Online classes and degrees were also offered.

Accreditation
Virginia College was accredited by the Accrediting Council for Independent Colleges and Schools (ACICS). When the U.S. Department of Education withdrew recognition from ACICS as a federally-recognized accreditor in September of 2016, Virginia College sought accreditation from the Accrediting Council for Continuing Education and Training (ACCET). In March of 2018, Virginia College's proposal for accreditation to ACCET was rejected, as was its subsequent appeal.

Criticism
In 2012, Virginia College was sued by the Mississippi Center for Justice on behalf of seven students. The lawsuit claims that Virginia College misled students about the value of their degrees, and that it specifically targeted misleading advertising to women and minority students. The case was remanded to arbitration.

See also
Vocational school
Online degrees

References

External links
 

Former for-profit universities and colleges in the United States
Educational institutions established in 1983
Educational institutions disestablished in 2018